Mehmed Rasim Kalakula was an Albanian politician that served the Ottoman Empire in the late 19th century as kaymakam of Western Anatolia.

References

Albanian politicians
People from Gjirokastër
Year of death missing
Year of birth missing